Juha Plosila (born June 21, 1965) is a retired male long jumper from Finland.

International competitions

References
digilander

1965 births
Living people
Finnish male long jumpers